Rod Hersey is a Canadian para-alpine skier. He represented Canada at the 1984 Winter Paralympics in alpine skiing.

He won the silver medal in the Men's Giant Slalom B1 event and in the Men's Alpine Combination B1 event.

He also competed in the Men's Downhill B1 and finished in 4th place.

See also 
 List of Paralympic medalists in alpine skiing

References 

Living people
Year of birth missing (living people)
Place of birth missing (living people)
Paralympic alpine skiers of Canada
Alpine skiers at the 1984 Winter Paralympics
Medalists at the 1984 Winter Paralympics
Paralympic silver medalists for Canada
Paralympic medalists in alpine skiing